Innocent was a Hungarian prelate in the 13th century, who served as the first known Bishop of Syrmia from 1232 to 1233.

Career
The Diocese of Syrmia was established as a suffragan bishopric of the Archdiocese of Kalocsa in 1229. As Innocent appeared as bishop for the first and last time in 1232, it is possible he was actually the first head of the newly established diocese. His name as a witness was preserved in a charter issued by papal legate  Giacomo di Pecorari, who transcribed that diploma of Robert, Archbishop of Esztergom, in which he put the Kingdom of Hungary under an interdict. Croatian historian Emerik Gašić claimed Innocent functioned as bishop throughout from 1231 to 1233, but there is no source for that. Innocent issued his charter on 27 November 1233, this is the last mention of him.

References

Sources 

 
 

13th-century Hungarian people
13th-century Roman Catholic bishops in Hungary
Roman Catholic Bishops of Syrmia